The Junior Eurovision Song Contest 2016 was the fourteenth edition of the annual Junior Eurovision Song Contest, which took place at the Mediterranean Conference Centre, in Valletta, Malta. Jon Ola Sand was appointed as the Executive Supervisor for the 2016 Junior Eurovision Song Contest, following the dismissal of the former supervisor, Vladislav Yakovlev.

For the first time since the inauguration of the contest the voting procedure did not include a public televote. The overall results were determined by combination of professional and young jurors.

The winner of the contest was Mariam Mamadashvili, who represented  with the song "Mzeo", marking the third time Georgia has won the Junior Eurovision Song Contest (following 2008 and 2011 respectively), making Georgia the first country to win the competition three times.  and  finished in second and third place, respectively.

Location 

During a press conference interview on 21 November 2015, a representative from the EBU stated that they had already begun approaching several broadcasters in regards to being the host country for the 2016 contest. On 13 April 2016, it was confirmed that Malta would host the contest. This was the second time that the country hosted the contest, having previously done so in 2014.

The chosen venue was the Mediterranean Conference Centre in Valletta, the Maltese capital. The main stage was in the Republic Hall which typically seats up to 1,400 people, while the green room was placed in a hall next to it, the Sacra Infermeria Hall.

Format

Executive supervisor dismissal
An announcement was made in December 2015, regarding the contract termination of the Junior Eurovision Song Contest Executive Supervisor Vladislav Yakovlev. Yakovlev was fired without any clear reasons after three contests, and was replaced by Jon Ola Sand who has been Executive Supervisor for the Eurovision Song Contest since .

Graphic design

During a press conference in Stockholm, Sweden on 13 May 2016, the logo and slogan of the contest were released, intending to represent the contest's values: connectivity, diversity, creativity and respect. The slogan for the contest was "Embrace". On 10 September 2016, it was revealed that each of the postcards preceding the participants' performances would showcase Malta. Filming took place in various locations, including Hastings Gardens and City Gate.

On 8 October 2016, PBS released details regarding the proposed stage design for the contest. The design included a circular stage with an LED backdrop and a spiral structure.

Hosts

On 28 October 2016, it was announced that Valerie Vella and Ben Camille would host the 2016 contest. Vella is known in Malta as a television presenter, having hosted the Maltese national final for the Eurovision Song Contest in 2002, 2009 and 2011. Camille is also known both as a television presenter and an actor in Malta, notable for having acted in Maltese television show Strada Stretta. He hosted Malta Eurovision Song Contest 2016 and presented the Maltese votes in the Eurovision Song Contest that year.

Voting
During the press conference for the Junior Eurovision Song Contest 2016, held in Stockholm,during the adult contest, the steering group announced several changes to the voting format for the 2016 contest. Previously, points had been awarded based on a combination of 50% national juries and 50% televoting, from each country with one more set of points also given out by a 'Kids' Jury'. The new voting system would be an adaptation of the new system used in the adult festival, but instead of the televoting, which was removed, a children's jury would be used by each country. This brought an end to the use of televoting for the first time. For the first time, an expert panel from the professional music industry provided feedback on each of the artists performances. The members of the panel were: Christer Björkman, Mads Grimstad, and the 2011 and 2012, participants at the adult version Jedward. Also for the first time since 2005 the starting 12 points were dropped. In 2005 these were added to make sure nobody would receive no points.

Interval acts

It was announced on 3 November 2016 that last year's Junior Eurovision winner, Destiny Chukunyere, would be part of the interval act during the show. Poli Genova who represented Bulgaria in the Eurovision Song Contest in 2011 and 2016 and also hosted the last year's contest, would also be a part of the interval acts, performing the song "If Love Was a Crime". On 16 November 2016, along the experts juries, it was announced that Jedward would join the interval act by performing a new song entitled "Hologram".

During the final, the participants of the contest performed the song "We Are" (separate song from this year's Australian entry with the same name).

Participating countries 
On 28 September 2016, it was confirmed that seventeen countries would take part in the contest. TVM, the Maltese television network operated by the Public Broadcasting Services (PBS), initially expected that a total of eighteen countries would participate in the 2016 contest.

Participants and results

Detailed voting results 

The votes of the adult jury and the kids jury were cast after the second dress rehearsal, whereas the votes of the expert jury were cast after the performances at the final. Mariam Mamadashvili who represented Georgia with the song "Mzeo", was declared the winner after all the votes had been announced from all of the seventeen participating countries and the expert juries. Below is a full breakdown of how the votes were cast.

12 points 
Below is a summary of the maximum 12 points awarded by each country's adult and kids jury. Countries in bold gave the maximum 24 points (12 points apiece from the adult and kids jury) to the specified entrant.

Spokespersons 

The first votes to be announced were those of the professional music industry jury, announced in the order of performance. The expert juries then announced their votes which had been cast live at the contest. Finally, the points awarded by the kids juries were announced as a total in order of the fewest to the greatest number of points received by each country. The spokespersons are shown below alongside each participating country.

 Andrea Leddy
 Mika
 Juna Dizdari
 Mikhail Smirnov
 Gaia Cauchi
 Milen Pavlov
 Antonija Dimitrijevska
 Nicoletta Włodarczyk
 Ruslan Aslanov
 Anna Trincher
 Jade Scicluna
 Tomislav Radojević
 Itay Limor
 Sebastian Hill
 Anneloes
 Loucas Demetriou
 Elene Sturua
 Mads Grimstad
 Christer Björkman
 Jedward

Other countries 

For a country to be eligible for potential participation in the Junior Eurovision Song Contest, it needs to be an active member of the European Broadcasting Union (EBU). It is unknown whether the EBU issue invitations of participation to all 56 active members like they do for the Eurovision Song Contest. At a press conference held during the Junior Eurovision Song Contest 2015, the former contest Executive Supervisor, Vladislav Yakovlev, announced that broadcasters in Estonia, Latvia and Lithuania had expressed interest in participation. Additionally, during the Junior Eurovision Song Contest press conference held in Stockholm during the Eurovision Song Contest 2016, Jon Ola Sand confirmed that the EBU was in contact with a number of broadcasters regarding participation including Belgium, France, Germany and Spain.

The EBU Active Members, listed below, had made the following announcements in regards to their decisions:

Active EBU members
 Right after the 2015 edition, Denmark's national broadcaster DR announced that they would "no longer" participate in further editions of the Junior Eurovision Song Contest. Jan Lagermand Lundme, the Entertainment President of DR, stated that the reason behind this decision was because the competition had become too much of a copy of the main Eurovision Song Contest and that the contest had strayed from its core idea—"the joy, the humor and the play".
 On 18 November 2015, it was reported that the French broadcaster France Télévisions was interested in returning to the contest. Edoardo Grassi, the Head of Delegation for France in the Eurovision Song Contest, was one of the jury members at the Maltese national selection for the 2016 Junior Eurovision, and was introduced by the hosts of the show as being the Head of Delegation for France in the Junior Eurovision Song Contest. The broadcaster was ultimately not among the participants for the 2016 edition.
On 24 May 2016, the Slovenian broadcaster Radiotelevizija Slovenija (RTVSLO) announced that they would withdraw from the contest for the first time since their debut in the 2014 edition of the contest. The broadcaster explained that the decision was made based on changes to the contest rules by the EBU, although not specifying which rule changes influenced their decision to withdraw from the competition. RTVSLO still broadcast the 2016 contest.
 Radiotelevisione svizzera (RSI) confirmed on 5 July 2016 that they would not return to the contest in 2016 due to the cost of the participation.

Broadcasts

Official album
Junior Eurovision Song Contest Valletta 2016 is a compilation album put together by the European Broadcasting Union, and was released by Universal Music Group on 11 November 2016. The album features all the songs from the 2016 contest, as well as two new songs by 2015 winner Destiny Chukunyere: "Embrace" and "Fast Life".

See also
ABU Radio Song Festival 2016
ABU TV Song Festival 2016
Bala Turkvision Song Contest 2016
Eurovision Young Musicians 2016
Eurovision Song Contest 2016
Turkvision Song Contest 2016

References

External links 

 
2016
2016 song contests
2016 in Malta
21st century in Valletta
2016 in radio
2016 television specials
Entertainment events in Malta
November 2016 events in Europe